Albion Atwood Perry (January 26, 1851 – February 1933) was an  American politician who served on the water board, school committee, on both branches of the Somerville city council and as the ninth Mayor, of Somerville, Massachusetts.

Early life
Perry was born to Rev. John Curtis and Mary Elizabeth (Baston) Perry in Standish, Maine on January 26, 1851.

Family
Perry married Mary Ellen Brooks on December 31, 1874.  On January 8, 1904 Mary was fatally injured in a fire, she died On January 8, 1904.

Notes

1851 births
1933 deaths
Boston University School of Law alumni
People from Standish, Maine
Massachusetts Republicans
Mayors of Somerville, Massachusetts
Massachusetts city council members